John Richard Niemiera (May 26, 1921 – December 27, 2003) was an American professional basketball player and coach. He spent two season in the National Basketball League (NBL) and one season in the Basketball Association of America (BAA) and one season in the National Basketball Association (NBA). During his NBL career he played for the Fort Wayne Zollner Pistons during the 1946–47 and 1947–48 seasons. He continued playing for the Pistons once they joined the BAA. During his final season in the NBA, Niemiera played for Anderson Packers after being traded by the Pistons along with Charles B. Black for Ralph Johnson and Howie Schultz. He attended the University of Notre Dame.

BAA/NBA career statistics

Regular season

Playoffs

External links

1921 births
2003 deaths
American men's basketball players
Anderson Packers players
Fort Wayne Pistons players
Fort Wayne Zollner Pistons players
Forwards (basketball)
Guards (basketball)
Notre Dame Fighting Irish men's basketball players
Basketball players from Chicago